Burgan Bank, established 1977, is Kuwait's second largest conventional bank by assets. It is a subsidiary of Kuwait Projects Company Holding and operates a network of 24 branches and over 100 ATMs. Burgan is one of the youngest banks in Kuwait. Burgan Bank recorded a profit of 74.8 million Kuwaiti Dinars for the year 2007, up 34% from 55.7 million in 2006.

Ahmad Al Abdullah Al Sabah is one of the former chairmen of the bank.

On 23 December 2012, Burgan Bank acquires from Eurobank a 70% stake in Tekfenbank, which is a Turkish bank in Cyprus.

References

External links
Official website
Kipco page

Companies listed on the Boursa Kuwait
1977 establishments in Kuwait
Banks established in 1977
Banks of Kuwait